Marée Humaine is Manu Militari's third album, released on September 11, 2012. Prior to the album's release, a music video for the song "Waiting", which shows an Afghan struggling for freedom in war, became available.The video was met with expected pushback, however, the video was taken down and the song was removed from the album.

Track listing

References

Manu Militari albums
2012 albums